The 2010–11 season marks the return of Olympique de Médéa to the second division of Algerian football, which is newly named Ligue 2 due to the professionalisation of the league system in Algeria, following a lengthy period of being in the lower divisions.

First team
As of 1 February 2011

Transfers

In

 Total spending:  ~ ?

Out

 Total income:  ~ ?

Statistics

Appearances, goals and cards
Last updated on 19 March 2011.
(Substitute appearances in brackets)

Captains
Accounts for all competitions.

Starting XI
These are the most used starting players (all competitions) in the most used formation throughout the complete season.

Competitions

Pre-season

League

Algerian Cup

Matches

Pre-season

League

Algerian Cup

References

Olympique de Médéa seasons
O Medea